Sphecius hogardii, the Caribbean cicada killer, is a species of sand wasp in the family Crabronidae. It is found in the Caribbean and North America.

Subspecies
These two subspecies belong to the species Sphecius hogardii:
 Sphecius hogardii bahamas Krombein, 1953
 Sphecius hogardii hogardii (Latreille, 1806)

References

Further reading

 

Crabronidae
Articles created by Qbugbot
Insects described in 1806